New Beginning is the fourth album by singer-songwriter Tracy Chapman, released in 1995 (see 1995 in music). According to Nielsen Soundscan, it is her biggest-selling recording since 1991, with 3.8 million copies sold, and according to the RIAA, it has shipped five million copies in the United States.

The album's sound consists of Chapman's trademark acoustic folk-rock sound and is mainly made up of slow low-key tunes and a few upbeat tracks. One notable exception is the  hit "Give Me One Reason", which is a blues piece. Chapman earned the Grammy Award for Best Rock Song for the track, and it was also nominated for Record of the Year, Song of the Year, and Best Female Rock Vocal Performance at the Grammy Awards of 1997.

The song "Unsung Psalm" was originally written and recorded for this album, but was cut. It was later included on her 2000 album Telling Stories. According to Billboard Magazine, the "New Beginning" single was the first disc to have a sticker printed on the back of the packaging detailing system requirements to play the multi-media footage.

The use of a didgeridoo in the "New Beginning" track was a source of controversy. Chapman was taught to play at the Didgeridoo University in Alice Springs; however, the use of a didgeridoo by women is taboo in many aboriginal nations. The album also featured an extensive use of backup singers, which was very rare in Chapman's earlier works.

Track listing
All songs written by Tracy Chapman.

"Heaven's Here on Earth" – 5:23
"New Beginning" – 5:33
"Smoke and Ashes" – 6:39
"Cold Feet" – 5:40
"At This Point in My Life" – 5:09
"The Promise" – 5:28
"The Rape of the World" – 7:07
"Tell It Like It Is" – 6:08
"Give Me One Reason" – 4:31
"Remember the Tinman" – 5:45
"I'm Ready" – 4:56
"Save a Place for Me" (hidden track)

Personnel

Musicians

Production

Charts

Weekly charts

Year-end charts

Certifications

Awards
39th Annual Grammy Awards

References

Tracy Chapman albums
1995 albums
Albums produced by Don Gehman
Elektra Records albums
Blues albums by American artists